David Turner (born 26 December 1948) is an English former professional footballer who played as a right back in the Football League for Everton and Southport. He also played non-league football for clubs including Bootle and Burscough Legion. He made his debutand only appearancefor Everton in the First Division on 20 April 1968 at home to Chelsea.

References

1948 births
Living people
Footballers from Derby
English footballers
Association football defenders
Everton F.C. players
Southport F.C. players
Bootle F.C. players
English Football League players